Paola USD 368 is a public unified school district headquartered in Paola, Kansas, United States.  The district includes the communities of Paola, Hillsdale, Somerset, and nearby rural areas.

Schools
The school district operates the following schools:
 Paola High School (9-12)
 Paola Middle School (6-8)
 Sunflower Elementary School (3-5)
 Cottonwood Elementary School (PreK-2)
 Hillsdale Learning Center - previously was Hillsdale Elementary School

See also
 Kansas State Department of Education
 Kansas State High School Activities Association
 List of high schools in Kansas
 List of unified school districts in Kansas

References

External links
 

School districts in Kansas